Bacarri Jamon Rambo (born June 27, 1990) is a former American football safety. He played college football for the University of Georgia, where he was recognized as an All-American, and was drafted by the Washington Redskins in the sixth round of the 2013 NFL Draft.

College career
Rambo played college football at the University of Georgia. Rambo was named an All-American by Scout.com as a junior in 2011.

Professional career

2013 NFL Combine

Washington Redskins
Rambo was selected by the Washington Redskins in the sixth round (191st overall) of the 2013 NFL Draft. He signed a four-year contract worth roughly $430,788 per year on May 13, 2013.
At the start of season, he was named the starting free safety. Due to his poor performance in the first two games, he not only lost his starting position, but was benched for several games. He returned to the field in Week 8 against the Denver Broncos due to the suspension of Brandon Meriweather. The Redskins waived Rambo on September 16, 2014.

Buffalo Bills
Rambo signed with the Buffalo Bills on November 17, 2014, after the Bills had placed cornerback Leodis McKelvin on injured reserve. Rambo had two interceptions off of Green Bay Packers quarterback Aaron Rodgers on December 14, 2014.

On November 12, 2015, Rambo contributed significantly during a Thursday night win against the New York Jets. Rambo forced two fumbles, one of which was returned by Duke Williams for a touchdown, the other recovered by Rambo himself. Rambo also had the game-sealing interception off of Ryan Fitzpatrick with less than a minute remaining in the 22-17 win. As a result of his performance in Week 10, Rambo was named as the AFC Defensive Player of the Week. He became a free agent at the end of the season.

Miami Dolphins
On October 25, 2016, Rambo was signed by the Miami Dolphins. In the Week 14 win over the Arizona Cardinals, he recorded his fourth career interception against quarterback Carson Palmer.

Buffalo Bills (second stint)
On July 25, 2017, Rambo signed with the Bills. On August 29, 2017, Rambo was released by the Bills.

NFL statistics

Key
 GP: games played
 COMB: combined tackles
 TOTAL: total tackles
 AST: assisted tackles
 SACK: sacks
 FF: forced fumbles
 FR: fumble recoveries
 FR YDS: fumble return yards 
 INT: interceptions
 IR YDS: interception return yards
 AVG IR: average interception return
 LNG: longest interception return
 TD: interceptions returned for touchdown
 PD: passes defended

References

External links
 Buffalo Bills bio 
 Washington Redskins bio 
 Georgia Bulldogs bio

1990 births
Living people
African-American players of American football
American football safeties
Georgia Bulldogs football players
Players of American football from Georgia (U.S. state)
People from Donalsonville, Georgia
Washington Redskins players
Buffalo Bills players
Miami Dolphins players
21st-century African-American sportspeople